Walsh Spur is a pointed rock spur 4 nautical miles (7 km) east of Mount Northampton in the Victory Mountains of Victoria Land. The spur forms the west side of the terminus of Whitehall Glacier. First mapped from surveys by New Zealand Geological Survey Antarctic Expedition (NZGSAE), 1957–58, and U.S. Navy aerial photography. Named by Advisory Committee on Antarctic Names (US-ACAN) for Commander Don Walsh, U.S. Navy, special assistant to the Assistant Secretary of the Navy for Research and Development, 1971–72. In 1960, with Jacques Piccard, Walsh descended to the bottom of the Mariana Trench in the Trieste.

Ridges of Victoria Land
Borchgrevink Coast